A-League may refer to:
 A-League Men, the Australasian men's professional association football league
 A-League Women, the Australasian women's professional association football league
 A-League Youth
 American Professional Soccer League, a defunct American soccer league known as A-League from 1995 to 1996
 A-League (1995–2004), a defunct American soccer league known as A-League from 1997 to 2004
 A-League (basketball), the second-tier men's basketball league in Taiwan

See also
 A Championship, the third-tier men's association football league in the Republic of Ireland